USS Hilary P. Jones (DD-427) was a  in the United States Navy during World War II. She was named for Admiral Hilary P. Jones.

Hilary P. Jones was launched by the Charleston Navy Yard 14 December 1939; sponsored by Mrs. Hilary P. Jones, widow of Admiral Jones; and commissioned 6 September 1940 at Charleston Navy Yard.

World War II Atlantic Service

Following shakedown in the mid Atlantic and exercises off Newport, Rhode Island, Hilary P. Jones departed 11 December for duty with the Neutrality Patrol in the Caribbean. She performed escort duties in those waters until 11 March 1941, when she returned to Hampton Roads. Training exercises off New England followed until 28 April, when the destroyer departed New York as a convoy escort. She steamed to Newfoundland, and for the next dangerous months before the attack on Pearl Harbor escorted cargo ships and transports in the North Atlantic. During one of these voyages to Iceland, 31 October 1941, the first naval vessel to be lost in the war, was torpedoed and sunk. Hilary P. Jones rescued 11 survivors of the attack before arriving Reykjavík 3 November.

The destroyer continued the hazardous North Atlantic convoy duty after America's entry into the war, battling both German submarines and the elements to bring troops and supplies to the Allies. Jones transferred to Mediterranean duty in January 1944 as production of escort vessels and frigates allowed the larger destroyers to be used for other assignments. She alternated at the bitterly contested Anzio beachhead with convoy duty between there and Naples until 20 March, often exchanging fire with German shore batteries off Anzio. After a brief respite the ship returned to her gunfire support duties at Anzio during April and early May, occasionally engaging in escort and antisubmarine patrol operations.

During June and July, Hilary P. Jones acted as escort ship for Mediterranean convoys and took part in training for the invasion of Southern France. She departed Naples on 13 August in convoy with French and British ships for the invasion, arriving three days later. The destroyer not only provided gunfire support missions during the assault, but also acted as electronic jamming vessel in the successful attempt to prevent radio-controlled bombs from harassing the area. In the weeks that followed she continued to range up and down the coast in support of the First Airborne Task Force destroying bridges, gun emplacements, railroad facilities and coastal vessels. She was attacked by a German E-boat 21 August, but destroyed the craft with gunfire. For her outstanding record during this period the ship received the Navy Unit Commendation.

Detached from her coastal support duties 1 October 1944, the destroyer continued convoy duties in the Mediterranean until returning to New York 12 January 1945. Following overhaul and training off Casco Bay, Maine, she sailed with her last transatlantic convoy 26 February – 9 April 1945. Jones was then designated for Pacific Fleet, and departed New York 24 April for the Panama Canal Zone and Pearl Harbor.

Convoys escorted

Pacific Service

Operating at Pearl Harbor from 18 May 1945, until 2 June, she then sailed for the advance base at Ulithi. Upon her arrival 13 June Hilary P. Jones joined the surface patrol forces in the Caroline Islands, making occasional escort voyages to Okinawa. At Ulithi when Japan surrendered, she steamed 18 August to Okinawa, Subic Bay, and then Tokyo. As an escort unit for 8th Army occupation troops, she entered Tokyo Bay 2 September as the surrender document was being executed onboard . Subsequently, she made two more voyages with occupation groups to Japan before ending her long war service and departed for the United States on 5 November.

Post World War II, Loan to ROC Navy and fate

Hilary P. Jones sailed to Charleston Navy Yard via Pearl Harbor and the Panama Canal and decommissioned there 6 February 1947. She was placed in the Charleston Group, Atlantic Reserve Fleet.

She was loaned to the Republic of China under the Military Assistance Program 26 February 1954. She served the Nationalist Chinese Navy as HanYan (DD-15). She was stricken on 1 November 1974 and broken up for scrap.

Awards
Hilary P. Jones received four battle stars for World War II service, in addition to her Navy Unit Commendation.

As of 2017, no other ship in the United States Navy has been named Hilary P. Jones.

References

External links
USS Hilary P. Jones website at Destroyer History Foundation
 

Benson-class destroyers
Ships built in Charleston, South Carolina
1939 ships
World War II destroyers of the United States
Benson-class destroyers of the Republic of China Navy